Křivsoudov  is a market town in Benešov District in the Central Bohemian Region of the Czech Republic. It has about 400 inhabitants.

Administrative parts
Villages of Jenišovice and Lhota Bubeneč are administrative parts of Křivsoudov.

Geography
It lies in the Křemešník Highlands.

History

The first written mention of Křivsoudov is from 1276, when there was a fortress owned by Oldřich of Říčany. He replaced it with a castle and founded also the Church of the Nativity of the Virgin Mary. From 1307 to 1424, the village was property of the bishopric of Prague. In the second half of the 14th century, during the rule of Jan of Jenštejn, Křivsoudov was promoted to a market town. The Trčka of Lípa family then owned Křivsoudov for more than 100 years, but they didn't live here and the local castle fell into disrepair.

Jindřich Střela of Rokyce bought Křivsoudov in 1550 and had repair the castle. During the rule of the Střela of Rokyce family, the market town obtained various privileges and prospered. The properties of the family were confiscated in 1622 after the Battle of White Mountain. The next notable owner of the estate was John Leopold of Trautson and Falkenstein, who bought it in 1702 and merged it with the Dolní Kralovice estate. In 1715, the castle and the market town were damaged by a fire and John Leopold left Křivsoudov.

Sights
The landmark of Křivsoudov is the Church of the Nativity of the Virgin Mary. It is a medieval Gothic church with Baroque modifications.

A valuable building is the pseudo-Renaissance town hall from the end of the 19th century.

References

External links

Market towns in the Czech Republic